Park Jin-man (born November 30, 1976) is a retired South Korean baseball shortstop. He batted and threw right-handed. He won the KBO League Golden Glove Award five times, and was also the 2006 Korean Series MVP.

He competed for the South Korea national baseball team at the 2000 Summer Olympics, where they won the bronze medal. He was also a member of the team that won the gold medal at the 2008 Olympic Games.

External links 
 Profile

1976 births
Living people
Sportspeople from Incheon
2006 World Baseball Classic players
Asian Games medalists in baseball
Baseball players at the 2000 Summer Olympics
Baseball players at the 2002 Asian Games
Baseball players at the 2006 Asian Games
Baseball players at the 2008 Summer Olympics
Hyundai Unicorns players
KBO League third basemen
KBO League shortstops
Korean Series MVPs
Medalists at the 2008 Summer Olympics
Olympic baseball players of South Korea
Olympic bronze medalists for South Korea
Olympic gold medalists for South Korea
Olympic medalists in baseball
Samsung Lions players
SSG Landers players
South Korean baseball players
South Korean Roman Catholics
Asian Games gold medalists for South Korea
Asian Games bronze medalists for South Korea
Medalists at the 2002 Asian Games
Medalists at the 2006 Asian Games

Medalists at the 2000 Summer Olympics